Steele Indian School Park Pond is a lake located in Steele Indian School Park in Phoenix, east of Central Avenue and north of Indian School Road.

Fish species
Rainbow Trout
Largemouth Bass
Sunfish
Catfish (Channel)
Tilapia
Carp

References

External links
Steele I.S. Park Pond
Video of Steele Indian School Lake

Reservoirs in Arizona
Reservoirs in Maricopa County, Arizona
Parks in Phoenix, Arizona